Albert Percy "Dews" Dewsbury (April 12, 1926 – December 16, 2006) was a Canadian ice hockey defenceman. He played in the National Hockey League with the Detroit Red Wings and Chicago Black Hawks between 1946 and 1956. He was born in Goderich, Ontario.

Career statistics

Regular season and playoffs

International

Awards and achievements
 1950 Stanley Cup Championship (Detroit Red Wings)
 1950 Calder Cup Championship (Indianapolis Capitals)
 1951 NHL All Star (Chicago Black Hawks)
 1958 Calder Cup Championship (Hershey Bears) 
 1959 World Championship (Belleville McFarlands)

External links
 
Al Dewsbury's Day With the Stanley Cup

1926 births
2006 deaths
Buffalo Bisons (AHL) players
Canadian ice hockey defencemen
Chicago Blackhawks players
Detroit Red Wings players
Hershey Bears players
Ice hockey people from Ontario
Indianapolis Capitals players
Montreal Royals (QSHL) players
Omaha Knights (USHL) players
Ontario Hockey Association Senior A League (1890–1979) players
People from Goderich, Ontario
Stanley Cup champions
Toronto Young Rangers players